A court is any person or institution, often as a government institution, with the authority to adjudicate legal disputes between parties and carry out the administration of justice in civil, criminal, and administrative matters in accordance with the rule of law. In both common law and civil law legal systems, courts are the central means for dispute resolution, and it is generally understood that all people have an ability to bring their claims before a court. Similarly, the rights of those accused of a crime include the right to present a defense before a court.

The system of courts that interprets and applies the law is collectively known as the judiciary. The place where a court sits is known as a venue. The room where court proceedings occur is known as a courtroom, and the building as a courthouse; court facilities range from simple and very small facilities in rural communities to large complex facilities in urban communities. 

It is also usual in the superior courts to have barristers, and attorneys or counsel, as assistants, though, often, courts consist of additional barristers, bailiffs, reporters, and perhaps a jury.

The term "the court" is also used to refer to the presiding officer or officials, usually one or more judges. The judge or panel of judges may also be collectively referred to as "the bench" (in contrast to attorneys and barristers, collectively referred to as "the bar").

In the United States, the legal authority of a court to take action is based on personal jurisdiction over the parties to the litigation and subject-matter jurisdiction over the claims asserted.

Etymology

The English word court is a cognate of the Latin word  from Ancient Greek  (meaning "garden", hence horticulture and orchard), both referring to an enclosed space.

The meaning of a judicial assembly is first attested in the 12th century, and derives from the earlier usage to designate a sovereign and his entourage, which met to adjudicate disputes in such an enclosed yard. The verb "to court", meaning to win favor, derives from the same source since people traveled to the sovereign's court to win his favor.

Jurisdiction

Jurisdiction is defined as the official authority to make legal decisions and judgements over a person or material item within a territory.

"Whether a given court has jurisdiction to preside over a given case" is a key question in any legal action. Three basic components of jurisdiction are personal jurisdiction over an individual or thing, jurisdiction over the particular subject matter (subject-matter jurisdiction) and territorial jurisdiction. Jurisdiction over a person refers to the full authority over a person regardless of where they live, jurisdiction over a particular subject matter refers to the authority over the said subject of legal cases involved in a case, and lastly territorial jurisdiction is the authority over a person within an x amount of space.

Other concepts of jurisdiction include general, exclusive, appellate, and (in the United States federal courts) diversity jurisdiction.

Trial and appellate courts

Trial courts are courts that hold trials. Sometimes termed "courts of first instance", trial courts have varying original jurisdiction. Trial courts may conduct trials with juries as the finders of fact (these are known as jury trials) or trials in which judges act as both finders of fact and finders of law (in some jurisdictions these are known as bench trials). Juries are less common in court systems outside the Anglo-American common law tradition.

Appellate courts are courts that hear appeals of lower courts and trial courts.

Some courts, such as the Crown Court in England and Wales, may have both trial and appellate jurisdictions.

Civil law courts and common law courts
The two major legal traditions of the western world are the civil law courts and the common law courts. These two great legal traditions are similar, in that they are products of western culture, although there are significant differences between the two traditions. Civil law courts are profoundly based upon Roman law, specifically a civil body of law entitled . This theory of civil law was rediscovered around the end of the eleventh century and became a foundation for university legal education starting in Bologna, Italy and subsequently being taught throughout continental European universities. 

Civil law is firmly ensconced in the French and German legal systems. Common law courts were established by English royal judges of the King's Council after the Norman Invasion of Britain in 1066. The royal judges created a body of law by combining local customs they were made aware of through traveling and visiting local jurisdictions. This common standard of law became known as "Common Law". This legal tradition is practiced in the English and American legal systems. In most civil law jurisdictions, courts function under an inquisitorial system. In the common law system, most courts follow the adversarial system. Procedural law governs the rules by which courts operate: civil procedure for private disputes (for example); and criminal procedure for violation of the criminal law. In recent years, international courts are being created to resolve matters not covered by the jurisdiction of national courts.  For example, the International Criminal Court, based in The Hague, in the Netherlands, or the Court of Permanent Lok Adalat (Public Utility Services), based in India.

Court television shows
Television show courts, which are not part of the judicial system and are generally private arbitrators, are depicted within the court show genre; however, the courts depicted have been criticized as misrepresenting real-life courts of law and the true nature of the legal system. Notable court shows include:

 Ace Attorney
 
 Caso Cerrado
 Eye for an Eye
 Judge Alex
 Judge Joe Brown
 Judge Judy
 Judge Mathis
 Judge Rinder
 Paternity Court
 The People's Court

International courts

 International judicial institution
 International Court of Justice
 International Criminal Court
 International Court of Arbitration

Types and organization of courts

 Administrative court
 Admiralty court
 Appellate court
 Circuit court
 City court
 Constitutional court
 Commercial Court (disambiguation)
 Community court
 Court of cassation
 Court of marine inquiry
 Court of record
 Court-martial
 District court
 Domestic violence court
 Drug court
 DWI court
 Ecclesiastical court
 Equity court
 Extraordinary court
 Family court
 Girl's court
 High court
 International court
 Juvenile court
 Labor court
 Land court
 Livability court
 Lower court
 Mental health court
 Ordinary court
 Patent court
 Probate court
 Small claims court
 Specialized court
 Superior court
 Supreme court
 Tax court
 Teen court
 Trial court
 Veterans' court

See also
 Kangaroo court

References

External links